The 2001–02 Kansas Jayhawks men's basketball team represented the University of Kansas in the 2001–02 NCAA Division I men's basketball season, which was the Jayhawks' 104th basketball season. The head coach was Roy Williams, who served his 14th year at KU. The team played its home games in Allen Fieldhouse in Lawrence, Kansas.

Roster

Schedule

|-
!colspan=9| Exhibition

|-
!colspan=9| Maui Invitational Tournament

|-
!colspan=9| Regular season

|-
!colspan=9| Big 12 tournament

|-
!colspan=9| NCAA tournament

Rankings

See also
 2002 NCAA Division I men's basketball tournament
 2002 Big 12 men's basketball tournament
 2001-02 NCAA Division I men's basketball season
 2001–02 NCAA Division I men's basketball rankings

References 

Kansas Jayhawks men's basketball seasons
Kansas
NCAA Division I men's basketball tournament Final Four seasons
Kansas
Jay
Jay